Cyphothyris disphaerias is a moth in the family Cosmopterigidae. It was described by Edward Meyrick in 1932. It is found on New Guinea.

References

Scaeosophinae
Taxa named by Edward Meyrick
Moths described in 1932